FK Dubnica is a Slovak football club, playing in the city of Dubnica nad Váhom.

History 
FK Dubnica was founded in 1926 and spent much of its early years playing in the regional Czechoslovakian leagues until 1977 where they were finally promoted to the national first division and finished a respectable 9th in their first season. The team continued in top flight football for 10 years before being relegated in 1987 and it would be at least another 10 years before the team would play at the highest national level again but this time in the independent state of Slovakia. In 1996 Dubnica gained its promotion from the Slovak second division to form part of a newly structured league consisting of one league and 15 other teams. Dubnica would then be relegated the following season, which would set a trend of swinging between the first and second divisions. 2005 saw a turn in fortunes for Dubnica, a 4th-place finish earned them a place in Europe for the second time playing in the Intertoto Cup.

The first match saw them come up against Vasas SC of Hungary, the match ended 0–0 in the first leg but the second leg saw Dubnica duly despatch the Hungarian side 2–0 at home. This win next saw the club taken to Turkey to face tough competition in B.B. Ankaraspor but Dubnica upset the home team with a shock 4–0 win and defended this lead well in the second leg only to lose 1–0. Dubnica's next match saw them take on the English team, Newcastle United F.C. but they proved to be too strong and failed to win either legs losing 3–1  and 2–0  respectively.

Events timeline 
 1926 – Founded as SK Dubnica
 1948 – Renamed ŠK Sokol Škoda Dubnica
 1952 – Renamed ŠK Sokol Vorošilov
 1953 – Renamed DŠO Spartak ŠK Dubnica
 1962 – Renamed TJ Spartak ŠK Dubnica
 1965 – Renamed TJ Spartak SMZ Dubnica
 1978 – Renamed TJ Spartak ZTS ŠK Dubnica
 1993 – Renamed FK ZTS Kerametal Dubnica
 1999 – Renamed FK ZTS Dubnica
 2003 – First European qualification, 2003
 2008 – Renamed MFK Dubnica
 2017 – Renamed FK Dubnica nad Vahom

Honours

Domestic 
 Slovak First League (1993 – Present)
 Best finish: 4th – 2004–05
 Slovak second division (1993 – Present)
  Winners (2): 2000–01, 2019–20
  Runners-up (1): 1997–98

Results

League and Cup history
Slovak League only (1993–present)
{|class="wikitable"
! style="color:white; background:#00308F;"| Season
! style="color:white; background:#00308F;"| Division (Name)
! style="color:white; background:#00308F;"| Pos./Teams
! style="color:white; background:#00308F;"| Pl.
! style="color:white; background:#00308F;"| W
! style="color:white; background:#00308F;"| D
! style="color:white; background:#00308F;"| L
! style="color:white; background:#00308F;"| GS
! style="color:white; background:#00308F;"| GA
! style="color:white; background:#00308F;"| P
! style="color:white; background:#00308F;"|Slovak Cup
! style="color:white; background:#00308F;" colspan=2|Europe
! style="color:white; background:#00308F;"|Top Scorer (Goals)
|-
|align=center|1993–94
|align=center|2nd (1. Liga)
|align=center|14/(16)
|align=center|30
|align=center|7
|align=center|11
|align=center|12
|align=center|35
|align=center|47
|align=center|25
|align=center|Round 1
|align=center|
|align=center|
|align=center|
|-
|align=center|1994–95
|align=center|2nd (1. liga)
|align=center|5/(16)
|align=center|30
|align=center|13
|align=center|6
|align=center|11
|align=center|40
|align=center|38
|align=center|45
|align=center|Round 1
|align=center|
|align=center|
|align=center|
|-
|align=center|1995–96
|align=center|2nd (1. liga)
|align=center bgcolor=green|4/(12) 
|align=center|30
|align=center|13
|align=center|10
|align=center|7
|align=center|48
|align=center|35
|align=center|49
|align=center|Round 2
|align=center|
|align=center|
|align=center|
|-
|align=center|1996–97
|align=center|1st (Mars Superliga)
|align=center bgcolor=red|15/(16)
|align=center|30
|align=center|8
|align=center|8
|align=center|14
|align=center|29
|align=center|43
|align=center|32
|align=center|Round 2
|align=center|
|align=center|
|align=center|
|-
|align=center|1997–98
|align=center|2nd (1. liga)
|align=center bgcolor=green|1/(16)
|align=center|34
|align=center|20
|align=center|6
|align=center|8
|align=center|74
|align=center|29
|align=center|66
|align=center|Round 2
|align=center|
|align=center| 
|align=center| 
|-
|align=center|1998–99
|align=center|1st (Mars Superliga)
|align=center|13/(16)
|align=center|30
|align=center|8
|align=center|4
|align=center|18
|align=center|28
|align=center|60
|align=center|28
|align=center|Semi-finals
|align=center|
|align=center|
|align=center|  Eugen Bari (8)  
|-
|align=center|1999–00
|align=center|1st (Mars Superliga)
|align=center bgcolor=red|11/(16)
|align=center|30
|align=center|9
|align=center|7
|align=center|14
|align=center|25
|align=center|35
|align=center|34
|align=center|Round 2
|align=center| 
|align=center| 
|align=center|  Peter Masarovič (4) 
|-
|align=center|2000–01
|align=center|2nd (1. Liga)
|align=center bgcolor=green|1/(18)
|align=center|34
|align=center|19
|align=center|9
|align=center|6
|align=center|44
|align=center|18
|align=center|66
|align=center|Round 1
|align=center|
|align=center|
|align=center|   Peter Masarovič (12) 
|-
|align=center|2001–02
|align=center|1st (Mars Superliga)
|align=center|8/(10)
|align=center|36
|align=center|9
|align=center|11
|align=center|16
|align=center|38
|align=center|48
|align=center|38
|align=center|Round 1
|align=center|
|align=center|
|align=center|  Pavol Straka (8) 
|-
|align=center|2002–03
|align=center|1st (Superliga)
|align=center|7/(10)
|align=center|36
|align=center|12
|align=center|7
|align=center|17
|align=center|41
|align=center|52
|align=center|43
|align=center|Round 2
|align=center|
|align=center|
|align=center| Pavol Straka (12)
|-
|align=center|2003–04
|align=center|1st (Corgoň Liga)
|align=center|6/(10)
|align=center|36
|align=center|12
|align=center|10
|align=center|14
|align=center|41
|align=center|42
|align=center|46
|align=center|Round 1
|align=center|UI
|align=center|2.R ( FC Koper)
|align=center|  Juraj Dovičovič (13)
|-
|align=center|2004–05
|align=center|1st (Corgoň Liga)
|align=center|4/(10)
|align=center|36
|align=center|13
|align=center|12
|align=center|11
|align=center|42
|align=center|43
|align=center|51
|align=center|Round 1
|align=center|UI
|align=center| 2.R ( FC Slovan Liberec)
|align=center|  Pavol Straka (9)
|-
|align=center|2005–06
|align=center|1st (Corgoň Liga)
|align=center|8/(10)
|align=center|36
|align=center|10
|align=center|10
|align=center|16
|align=center|41
|align=center|55
|align=center|40
|align=center|Round 1
|align=center| UI
|align=center| 3.R ( Newcastle Utd.)
|align=center| Michal Filo (8)
|-
|align=center|2006–07
|align=center|1st (Corgoň Liga)
|align=center|10/(12)
|align=center|22
|align=center|6
|align=center|7
|align=center|9
|align=center|24
|align=center|35
|align=center|25
|align=center|Round 2
|align=center| 
|align=center| 
|align=center|  Michal Filo (10)
|-
|align=center|2007–08
|align=center|1st (Corgoň Liga)
|align=center|9/(12)
|align=center|33
|align=center|7
|align=center|12
|align=center|14
|align=center|34
|align=center|53
|align=center|33
|align=center|Round 3
|align=center| 
|align=center| 
|align=center|  Mouhamadou Seye (13) 
|-
|align=center|2008–09
|align=center|1st (Corgoň Liga)
|align=center|8/(12)
|align=center|33
|align=center|10
|align=center|6
|align=center|16
|align=center|43
|align=center|49
|align=center|37
|align=center|Quarter-finals
|align=center|
|align=center| 
|align=center|  Mouhamadou Seye (9)
|-
|align=center|2009–10
|align=center|1st (Corgoň Liga)
|align=center|9/(12)
|align=center|33
|align=center|8
|align=center|12
|align=center|14
|align=center|27
|align=center|42
|align=center|36
|align=center|Round 2
|align=center|
|align=center|
|align=center|  Peter Šulek (3)  Michal Filo (3)  Tomáš Zápotoka (3)  Matej Gorelka (3)
|-
|align=center|2010–11
|align=center|1st (Corgoň Liga)
|align=center bgcolor=red|12/(12)
|align=center|33
|align=center|7
|align=center|10
|align=center|16
|align=center|23
|align=center|47
|align=center|31
|align=center|Round 3
|align=center| 
|align=center| 
|align=center|  Matej Ižvolt (4)
|-
|align=center|2011–12
|align=center|2nd (2. Liga)
|align=center|8/(12)
|align=center|33
|align=center|10
|align=center|13
|align=center|10
|align=center|32
|align=center|31
|align=center|43
|align=center|Round 1
|align=center| 
|align=center|
|align=center|  Michal Filo (8)
|-
|align=center|2012–13
|align=center|2nd (2. Liga)
|align=center|8/(12)
|align=center|33
|align=center|11
|align=center|8
|align=center|14
|align=center|31
|align=center|38
|align=center|41
|align=center|Round 1
|align=center|
|align=center|
|align=center|  Roland Šmahajčík (8) 
|-
|align=center|2013–14
|align=center|2nd (2. Liga)
|align=center|8/(12)
|align=center|33
|align=center|10
|align=center|5
|align=center|18
|align=center|30
|align=center|64
|align=center|35
|align=center|Round 1
|align=center|
|align=center|
|align=center|  Roland Šmahajčík (6) 
|-
|align=center|2014–15
|align=center|2nd (DOXXbet Liga)
|align=center bgcolor=red|24/(24)
|align=center|32
|align=center|4
|align=center|9
|align=center|19
|align=center|31
|align=center|62
|align=center|15
|align=center|Round 3
|align=center|
|align=center|
|align=center|  Richard Čiernik (6)
|-
|align=center|2015–16
|align=center|3rd (TIPOS III. liga Západ)
|align=center|15/(18)
|align=center|32
|align=center|6
|align=center|12
|align=center|14
|align=center|27
|align=center|43
|align=center|30
|align=center|Round 2
|align=center|
|align=center|
|align=center|  Miloš Mojto (7)
|-
|align=center|2016–17
|align=center|3rd (TIPOS III. liga Západ)
|align=center|6/(19)
|align=center|36
|align=center|16
|align=center|7
|align=center|13
|align=center|49
|align=center|43
|align=center|55
|align=center|Did not enter
|align=center|
|align=center|
|align=center| ?
|-
|align=center|2017–18
|align=center|3rd (TIPOS III. liga Západ)
|align=center bgcolor=green|1/(16)
|align=center|34
|align=center|27
|align=center|5
|align=center|2
|align=center|83
|align=center|10
|align=center|86
|align=center|Round 4
|align=center|
|align=center|
|align=center|  Ján Vaško (13)
|-
|align=center|2018–19
|align=center|2nd (II. liga)
|align=center|7/(16)
|align=center|30
|align=center|13
|align=center|6
|align=center|11
|align=center|55
|align=center|42
|align=center|45
|align=center | Round 5
|align=center| 
|align=center| 
|align=center|  Miladin Vujošević (23)
|-
|align=center|2019–20
|align=center|2nd (II. liga)
|align=center|1/(16)
|align=center|20
|align=center|14
|align=center|4
|align=center|2
|align=center|45
|align=center|22
|align=center|46
|align=center | Round 2
|align=center| 
|align=center| 
|align=center|  Maroš Čurik (7)   Marek Kuzma (7)
|-
|align=center|2020–21
|align=center|2nd (II. liga)
|align=center|11/(15)
|align=center|28
|align=center|8
|align=center|9
|align=center|11
|align=center|28
|align=center|37
|align=center|33
|align=center | Round 4
|align=center| 
|align=center| 
|align=center|  Marek Kuzma (8)
|-
|align=center|2021–22
|align=center|2nd (II. liga)
|align=center|11/(15)
|align=center|30
|align=center|8
|align=center|7
|align=center|15
|align=center|33
|align=center|51
|align=center|31
|align=center | Round 2
|align=center| 
|align=center| 
|align=center|  Marek Kuzma (9)
|}

European competition history

Sponsorship

Player records

Most goals

Players whose name is listed in bold are still active.

Current squad 
Updated 24 January 2023.

For recent transfers, see List of Slovak football transfers winter 2022–23.

Reserve team 
 MFK Dubnica B

Notable players 
Had international caps for their respective countries. Players whose name is listed in bold represented their countries while playing for MFK.

Past (and present) players who are the subjects of Wikipedia articles can be found here.
	

 Marián Bochnovič
 Peter Doležaj
 Juraj Dovičovič	
 	Michal Filo		
 Michal Hanek	
 Michal Jonáš	
 Ján Kapko
 Peter Kiška	
 Pavel Kováč	
 Adam Nemec	
 Peter Pekarík
 Dušan Perniš	
 Peter Petráš		
 Andrej Porázik
 Siradji Sani	
 Marek Střeštík
 Ľubomír Šatka
 Peter Šinglár
 Lukáš Tesák
 Martin Valjent

Managers 

  Antonín Juran (1996–97)
  Peter Zelenský (1997–98)
  Anton Dragúň (1998–2000)
  Jozef Jankech (2000–01)
  Peter Gergely (2001–02)
  Stanislav Griga (2002–03)
  Jozef Jankech (2003–05)
  Ľubomír Nosický (2005–06)
  Anton Dragúň (2006-07)
  Juraj Bútora (2007–08)
  Peter Gergely (2008)
  Peter Gergely (2009–11)
  Peter Nemečkay (2011–12)
  Peter Gergely (2012–2014)
  Pavol Kopačka (2015–2016)
  Juraj Bútora (2014–15)
  Peter Gergely (2018–19)
  Peter Jakuš (2020–2022)
  Andy Smith (2022)
  Bohumil Páník (2022-)

References

External links 
 Official website

 
Association football clubs established in 1926
Football clubs in Slovakia
1926 establishments in Slovakia